FC Ile-Saulet is a defunct Kazakhstani football club that was based in Otegen Batyr (Ile District of Almaty Province).

History
The club was formed in 2006, debuting in the Kazakhstan First Division in 2008, before ceasing to exist at the end of the 2013 season.

Domestic history

Honours
Kazakhstan First Division (1): 2012

References

External links
The team's squad in 2010

Association football clubs established in 2006
Defunct football clubs in Kazakhstan
2006 establishments in Kazakhstan